Classic Game Room (commonly abbreviated CGR) was a video game review web series produced, directed, edited and hosted by Mark Bussler of Inecom, LLC. The show reviewed both retro and modern video games along with gaming accessories, pinball machines, and minutiae such as gaming mousepads and food products.

The show broadcast its reviews via video-sharing website YouTube under the screen name 'Lord Karnage' until late 2013, when they moved to Dailymotion, citing issues with YouTube. On May 8, 2014, via the Classic Game Room's Facebook Page and YouTube channel, it was announced that the show would again be posting episodes on YouTube. It has also moved onto Patreon and Amazon Prime, before finally being cancelled in April 2019.

History

The Game Room Era (1999-2000) 
The show was originally titled The Game Room and presented by Mark Bussler and David Crosson. Founded by Bussler, it launched on November 7, 1999 on the internet startup website FromUSAlive. The pair had met at film school and shared a mutual love of movies and video games.

At first, Bussler and Crosson planned to review mainly then-modern games, but after a segment on older games proved to be popular, the show began reviewing earlier titles. The show was run on a tight US$50 budget, so improvised special effects were used. However, the low-budget nature of the show led to slow episode production rates, and when revenue failed to cover the costs of running the show, The Game Room was canceled on October 23, 2000. Tokyo Xtreme Racer 2 for the Sega Dreamcast was the last game to be reviewed on the show. Crosson moved onto a career in pharmaceuticals, while Bussler would spend the next 8 years producing and directing documentaries on American history, such as Expo: Magic of the White City, and working with actors such as Gene Wilder and Richard Dreyfuss.

The Revival (HD) Era (2008-2015) 
The show returned as Classic Game Room HD (HD standing for Heavy Duty according to Bussler) on February 20, 2008, hosted by Bussler. Crosson appeared at the end of the show's first episodes, Captain America and The Avengers, where Mark asked him what he thought of the game.

On August 29, 2009 Bussler announced the launch of the Classic Game Room website ClassicGameRoom.net (now ClassicGameRoom.com) on the show's YouTube channel. The website hosts links and embedded videos to all the show's episodes as well as written reviews. Later, the site began hosting reviews written by fans of the show as well as linking to their videos.

In May 2010, Inecom launched a second show titled CGR Undertow hosted by Derek Buck. Later he was joined by TJ and a rotating cast of other reviews. The show had reviewers give their own take on games reviewed by Mark as well as other games not reviewed on the main show. In early 2012, some Classic Game Room reviews were co-hosted by Derek and TJ.

In late 2013, Classic Game Room left YouTube and began posting videos on Dailymotion. On May 8, 2014, Classic Game Room announced via its Facebook page and YouTube Channel that they will be returning to YouTube on May 10. Episodes first hosted on Dailymotion were added to their respective YouTube channels. The last episode posted on dailymotion was the review of Mario Kart 8.

On November 2, 2015, Bussler announced that the show would highly slow its production following the end of the 2015 year. Changes would include the shutting down of the show store and its secondary channel CGR Undertow entirely ending production. Bussler stated that this is due to a change in his life and he would like to focus more on his writing and film making. He also said that he would continue the show as a hobby similar to how it began for him.

CGR Mark 3, Patreon and Amazon (2016-2017) 
Bussler later opened a Patreon for the series at the recommendation of fans in order to keep the series operating as normal, but would be renamed Classic Game Room Mark 3. The first CGR Mk3 was released on January 8, 2016. During mid-2016, due to declining YouTube ad revenue, Bussler experimented with a premium content delivery system. Subscribers on Patreon received full length game reviews, dubbed "Hyper Cuts", and free streaming video services received significantly shortened preview-length versions of the same reviews - effectively creating a partial paywall.

After this was met with negative reaction by fans, overall average runtime of the free streaming reviews returned to their normal length, with extended reviews available to Patreon subscribers. The extended reviews later became available on Amazon Prime in December that year.

CGR Mark 4 (2017-2018) 
In June 2017, Bussler announced another update to Classic Game Room, intending to broaden the content variety that would encompass toys, comics and anything else Bussler fancied. Subsequent videos dropped the Mark 3 moniker.

Classic Game Room 2085 (2018) 
On January 19, Bussler announced another new move off on YouTube and supposedly permanently onto Amazon Prime, under the new title of Classic Game Room 2085, for March. Bussler cited irrevocable differences and frustration with YouTube and its services as the contributing factor. Season 1 debuted on March 2.

On February 5, 2019, Bussler said a second season was as yet undecided, though now unlikely.

Classic Game Room Infinity (2018-2019) 
As of December 2018, Bussler returned to YouTube (as well as to Instagram and TikTok) with a new show titled Classic Game Room Infinity, which focuses on shorter, snappier content.

Closure and rebranding
On April 24, 2019, Bussler announced on Instagram that he had decided to end all video production, and to continue the Classic Game Room brand as a book publisher. It has distributed books on video games, video production and American history. The channel was briefly known as Turbo Volcano and sold t-shirt merchandise, before being rebranded as '80s Comics reviewing classic comic books. After a year of inactivity, the channel was rebranded as CGR Publishing in 2022 and began posting new commercials for books, as well as episodes of Bussler's podcast.

Other series

CGR Interviews 
Bussler has also conducted a number of interviews with people involved with the video game industry, as part of the CGR Interviews series, such as his interview with Tommy Tallarico, video game soundtrack composer and founder of the Video Games Live concert series. In addition, Bussler has been interviewed for The Art of Community book.

CGR Films 
A documentary film, Classic Game Room - The Rise and Fall of the Internet's Greatest Video Game Review Show was released on August 28, 2007, on DVD. It is 100 minutes long and featured footage from a number of the original reviews and commentary from Bussler and Crosson. The film was directed by Mark Bussler.

In 2015, a second film, also directed by Bussler, The Best of Classic Game Room: 15th Anniversary Collection was released on Blu-ray and DVD.  It has a run time of 280 minutes and features a collection of videos previously available on YouTube but also includes plenty of exclusive material including exclusive game reviews, an interview with Dave Crosson, a commentary track and more all wrapped in a comedic story arc involving time travel, robots, and clones.

2015 also saw the release of a compilation film from the sister channel CGR Undertow, A Great Big Bunch of CGR Undertow on DVD. It is a collection of previously released reviews presented by Derek Buck and his clone. Special features include a mini documentary and a blooper reel.

In 2016, Bussler announced a series of feature length video game reviews, the Classic Game Room Feature Reviews, beginning with MUSHA. The 90 minute reviews, funded by Kickstarter crowdfunding, would be in-depth analysis of games, covering everything from presentation to controllers, with comical elements. The following reviews were Herzog Zwei and Super Pac-Man.

CGR Podcast
In November 2021, Bussler launched a new podcast, CGR Podcast, featuring Turbo Volcano . Presented by Bussler, the show discussed behind-the-scenes work in publishing and retro pop culture. Episodes began to be uploaded to YouTube the following year, starting with Episode #8: Nobody Puts Truxton in the corner.

See also
 Expo: Magic of the White City - a 2005 documentary by Bussler on the Chicago World's Fair, narrated by Gene Wilder.

References

External links 
 
 Mark Bussler at the Internet Movie Database
 Classic Game Room at the Internet Movie Database
 Classic Game Room: The Rise and Fall of the Internet's Greatest Video Game Review Show at the Internet Movie Database

Internet properties established in 1999
Internet properties disestablished in 2000
Internet properties established in 2008
Video game news websites
2000s YouTube series
American YouTubers
American non-fiction web series
Nostalgia
Computing culture
2010s YouTube series
1999 establishments in Pennsylvania